Thomas Ward (born 3 October 1963) is a British mathematician who works in ergodic theory and dynamical systems and its relations to number theory.

Education
Ward was the fourth child of the physicist Alan Howard Ward and Elizabeth Honor Ward, a physics teacher. He attended Woodlands Primary School in Lusaka, Zambia, Waterford Kamhlaba United World College in Swaziland, and (briefly) the Thomas Hardye School in Dorchester, England. He studied mathematics at the University of Warwick from 1982, gaining an MSc with dissertation entitled "Automorphisms of solenoids and p-adic entropy" in 1986 and a PhD with dissertation entitled "Topological entropy and periodic points for Zd actions on compact abelian groups with the Descending Chain Condition" in 1989, both under the supervision of Klaus Schmidt.

Career

Ward worked at the University of Maryland in College Park, the Ohio State University, and the University of East Anglia. In 2012 he moved to Durham University as Pro-Vice-Chancellor for Education, in 2016 to the University of Leeds as Deputy Vice-Chancellor for Student Education, and to Newcastle University as Pro-Vice-Chancellor for Education in 2021. He served in editorial roles for the London Mathematical Society from 2002 to 2012 and was a managing editor of Ergodic Theory and Dynamical Systems from 2012 to 2014. He served on the HEFCE advisory committees for Widening Participation and Student Opportunity (2013–15) and Teaching Excellence and Student Opportunity (2015–17).

Works
In 2012 Ward, along with Graham Everest (posthumously) was awarded the Paul R. Halmos - Lester R. Ford Award for A Repulsion Motif in Diophantine Equations printed in the American Mathematical Monthly.

Selected papers 

 with Graham Everest, Richard Miles, and Shaun Stevens: Orbit-counting in non-hyperbolic dynamical systems. J. Reine Angew. Math. 608 (2007), 155–182.
 with Manfred Einsiedler, Douglas Lind, and Richard Miles: Expansive subdynamics for algebraic Zd-actions. Ergodic Theory Dynam. Systems 21 (2001), no. 6, 1695–1729.
 with Vijay Chothi and Graham Everest: S-integer dynamical systems: periodic points. J. Reine Angew. Math. 489 (1997), 99–132.
 with Klaus Schmidt: Mixing automorphisms of compact groups and a theorem of Schlickewei, Invent. Math. 111 (1993), no. 1, 69–76.
 with Qing Zhang: The Abramov-Rokhlin entropy addition formula for amenable group actions, Monatsh. Math. 114 (1992), no. 3–4, 317–329.
 with Douglas Lind and Klaus Schmidt: Mahler measure and entropy for commuting automorphisms of compact groups, Invent. Math. 101 (1990), no. 3, 593–629.
 with Douglas Lind: Automorphisms of solenoids and p-adic entropy, Ergodic Theory Dynam. Systems 8 (1988), no. 3, 411–419.

Edited proceedings 

 with Pieter Moree, Anke Pohl, and Lubomir Snoha: Dynamics: Topology and Numbers (memorial volume for Sergiǐ Kolyada). Contemporary Mathematics, 744, Amer. Math. Society (2020).
 with Sergiǐ Kolyada, Martin Möller, and Pieter Moree: Dynamics and numbers, Contemporary Mathematics, 669, Amer. Math. Society (2016).
 with Sergiǐ Kolyada, Yuri Manin, Martin Möller, and Pieter Moree: Dynamical Numbers: Interplay between Dynamical Systems and Number Theory, Contemporary Mathematics, 532, Amer. Math. Society (2010).
 with Sergiǐ Kolyada and Yuri Manin: Algebraic and Topological Dynamics, Contemporary Mathematics, 385, Amer. Math. Society (2005).

Books 

 with Menny Aka and Manfred Einsiedler: A Journey Through The Realm of Numbers: From Quadratic Equations to Quadratic Reciprocity. Springer Verlag (2020) .
 with Manfred Einsiedler: Functional Analysis, Spectral Theory, and Applications, Springer Verlag (2017) .
 with Manfred Einsiedler: Ergodic Theory with a view towards Number Theory, Springer Verlag (2011) .
 with Graham Everest: An Introduction to Number Theory, Springer Verlag (2005) .
 with Graham Everest, Alf van der Poorten, and Igor Shparlinski: Recurrence Sequences, American Math. Society (2003) .
 with Graham Everest: Heights of Polynomials and Entropy in Algebraic Dynamics, Springer Verlag (1999) .

References

External links 
 Newcastle University web page
 Articles on arXiv
 Mathematics Genealogy Project web page
 Author web page on MathSciNet
 Author web page on Zentralblatt

21st-century British mathematicians
20th-century British mathematicians
Ohio State University faculty
1963 births
Living people
Waterford Kamhlaba alumni
People educated at a United World College
Alumni of the University of Warwick
University of Maryland, College Park faculty
Academics of Durham University
Academics of the University of East Anglia
Academics of the University of Leeds